The Screen Guild Theater is a radio anthology series broadcast from 1939 until 1952 during the Golden Age of Radio. Leading Hollywood stars performed adaptations of popular motion pictures. Originating on CBS Radio, it aired under several different titles including The Gulf Screen Guild Show, The Gulf Screen Guild Theater, The Lady Esther Screen Guild Theater and The Camel Screen Guild Players. Fees that would ordinarily have been paid to the stars and studios were instead donated to the Motion Picture Relief Fund, and were used for the construction and maintenance of the Motion Picture Country House.

Production
The Screen Guild Theater had a long run beginning January 8, 1939, lasting for 14 seasons and 527 episodes. Actors on the series included Ethel Barrymore, Lionel Barrymore, Ingrid Bergman, Humphrey Bogart, Eddie Cantor, Gary Cooper, Bing Crosby, Bette Davis, Jimmy Durante, Nelson Eddy, Douglas Fairbanks Jr., Clark Gable, Judy Garland, Gene Kelly, Sam Levene, Johnny Mercer, Agnes Moorehead, Dennis Morgan, Gregory Peck, Fred Astaire, Frank Sinatra, Shirley Temple, and Dinah Shore.

The series began with a variety format, with mixed success. The program increasingly came to rely on adaptations of major motion pictures—presenting a considerable challenge to writers who had to compress the narrative into 22 minutes.

Fees these actors would typically charge were donated to the Motion Picture Relief Fund, in order to support the creation and maintenance of the Motion Picture Country Home for retired actors. A 1940 magazine article noted that The Screen Guild Theater was "the only sponsored program on the air which gives all its profits to charity." Nearly $800,000 had been contributed by the summer of 1942.

The first three seasons of the CBS series were sponsored by Gulf Oil. With uncertainties in the oil market due to World War II, Gulf dropped the show, and in 1942 the Lady Esther cosmetics corporation assumed sponsorship. The Lady Esther Screen Guild Theater was consistently one of the top ten radio programs. Reverses in the cosmetics industry led Lady Esther to withdraw in 1947, and Camel Cigarettes purchased a three-year contract. Changing time slots and networks brought about a decline in ratings. In the fall of 1950, the series returned to CBS, where it ran until its final broadcast June 30, 1952. The Screen Guild Theater earned a total of $5,235,607 for the Motion Picture Relief Fund.

Notable broadcasts
"A table of highlights would run many pages," wrote radio historian John Dunning, who lists the following notable Screen Guild broadcasts:
 The Blue Bird with Shirley Temple and Nelson Eddy (December 24, 1939)
 High Sierra with Humphrey Bogart (January 4, 1942)
 Sergeant York with Gary Cooper and Walter Brennan (January 19, 1942)
 Yankee Doodle Dandy with James Cagney, Rita Hayworth and Betty Grable (October 19, 1942)
 Command Decision with Clark Gable, Walter Pidgeon, Van Johnson, John Hodiak, Edward Arnold and Brian Donlevy (March 3, 1949)

Shirley Temple's parents declined an offer of $35,000 for her to perform a radio version of The Blue Bird on a commercial broadcast; instead, she presented it on the Screen Guild program without payment. An attempt was made on her life during the show. As Temple was singing "Someday You'll Find Your Bluebird", a woman in the audience rose from her seat and pulled out a handgun, pointing it directly at her. The woman hesitated and was disarmed. It was later discovered that she had lost a child on the day it was publicly stated that Temple was born, and blamed her for stealing her daughter's soul.

The series benefited during its 1950–51 season on ABC, when it was expanded to a full hour. Few broadcasts are known to have survived in radio collections:

 Twelve O'Clock High with Gregory Peck, Ward Bond, Reed Hadley, Millard Mitchell, John Kellogg and Hugh Marlowe (September 7, 1950)
 Ninotchka with Joan Fontaine and William Powell (September 14, 1950)
 Champagne for Caesar with Ronald Colman, Vincent Price, Audrey Totter, Barbara Britton and Art Linkletter (October 5, 1950)
 Tell It to the Judge with Rosalind Russell and Robert Cummings (November 2, 1950)
 Birth of the Blues with Bing Crosby, Dinah Shore and Phil Harris (January 18, 1951)

Broadcast history
The Screen Guild Theater was hosted by George Murphy in 1939, and Roger Pryor for the remainder of its run.
CBS (January 8, 1939 – June 28, 1948), as:
The Gulf Screen Guild Show (1939–40), 
The Gulf Screen Guild Theater (1940–42), 
The Lady Esther Screen Guild Theater (1942–47), and 
The Camel Screen Guild Players (1947–48)
NBC (October 7, 1948 – June 29, 1950), as The Camel Screen Guild Players
ABC (September 7, 1950 – May 31, 1951), as The Screen Guild Players
CBS (December 13, 1951 – June 14, 1952), as Stars in the Air
CBS (December 13, 1951 – March 6, 1952), as Hollywood Sound Stage and Hollywood On Stage
CBS (March 13–June 29, 1952), as The Screen Guild Theater
 AFRS Playhouse 25
 AFRTS Screen Guild Theatre
 AFRS The Frontline Theatre
 AFRS The Globe Theatre (hosted by Herbert Marshall)
 AFRTS Hollywood Sound Stage

See also

Academy Award
Author's Playhouse
The Campbell Playhouse
Cavalcade of America
The CBS Radio Workshop
The Cresta Blanca Hollywood Players
Curtain Time
Ford Theatre
General Electric Theater
Hollywood Playhouse
Lux Radio Theater
The Mercury Theatre on the Air
The MGM Theater of the Air
Screen Director's Playhouse
Stars over Hollywood (radio program)
Suspense
The United States Steel Hour

References

External links
Screen Guild Theater 348 episodes at the Internet Archive
Screen Guild Theater biography and complete episode guide at Digital Deli
Guide to the Screen Guild Players Recordings Collection, 1942–1948 at the University of California, Santa Barbara

American radio dramas
CBS Radio programs
1930s American radio programs
1940s American radio programs
1950s American radio programs
NBC radio programs
ABC radio programs
Anthology radio series